The Lviv Insulator Company Ltd is a Limited Liability Company, established in 2002 and based in the city of Lviv, Ukraine, it is a sole producer of glass insulators in Ukraine. It is the runner-up producer of glass line insulators in the countries of former Soviet Union.
The address: 301 Zelena str., Lviv, Ukraine.Postal index 79066

The short official name: LIC

History. Lviv Insulator Factory
LIC is the successor of Lviv Insulator Plant (LIP), which was found in 1965.
LIP was one of the largest producers of insulators in the world. The Lviv Insulator Factory was one of the most capable manufacturers of burned and hard-tempered glass. The Lviv Insulator Company has adopted and continued the best traditions of manufacturing from LIP. More than 250 million items of insulators have been manufacturing since the moment of its foundation, now they are successfully used on the electric lines with power in a range of 0,4-1150 kV in more than in 30 different countries all over the world.

See also 
Insulator (electrical)

External links 
 www.energyglass.com.ua
 http://interexpo.com.ua/rus/catalog/cat_534-items_6500-mode_full.html
 http://yellow.com.ua/company.aspx?a=15&c=4418&r=1016

Manufacturing companies of Ukraine
LIC
Manufacturing companies of the Soviet Union
Ukrainian companies established in 2002